Women in the House may refer to:
Women in the House of Commons of the United Kingdom
Women in the House of Lords
Women in the House of Representatives (disambiguation)

See also
 Women of the House, an American sitcom television series
 Women in Congress (disambiguation)
 Women senators (disambiguation)
 Women in Parliament (disambiguation)
 Women in government
 House (legislature)